Aurora's at-large congressional district is the sole congressional district of the Philippines in the province of Aurora. It has been represented in the House of Representatives since 1987 and earlier in the Batasang Pambansa from 1984 to 1986. Aurora first elected a single representative provincewide at-large for the Regular Batasang Pambansa following its creation as a regular province separate from Quezon in 1978 and the subsequent 1984 Philippine constitutional plebiscite that amended the 1973 constitution and abolished the regional at-large assembly districts. Before 1978, the province was represented in the national legislatures as part of Quezon's 1st congressional district. The district was re-created on February 2, 1987 following the ratification of the 1987 constitution that restored the House of Representatives. It is currently represented in the 18th Congress by Rommel T. Angara of the Laban ng Demokratikong Pilipino (LDP).

Representation history

Election results

2022

2019

2016

2013

2010

See also
Legislative district of Aurora

References

Congressional districts of the Philippines
Politics of Aurora (province)
1984 establishments in the Philippines
At-large congressional districts of the Philippines
Congressional districts of Central Luzon
Constituencies established in 1984